Andrén or Andren is a surname. Notable people with the surname include: 

Anders Andrén (born 1952), Swedish archaeologist
Arvid Andrén (1902–1999), Swedish art historian
Gunnar Andrén (born 1946), Swedish Liberal People's Party politician
Oscar Andrén (1899-1981), Swedish boxer
Peter Andren (1946–2007), Australian politician
Viktor Andrén (born 1994), Swedish ice hockey player